Jieping Zhu (祝介平; born 1965 in Xiaoshan, Hangzhou, China) is an organic chemist specializing in natural product total synthesis and organometallics. He is a professor of chemistry at EPFL (École Polytechnique Fédérale de Lausanne) and the head of the Laboratory of Synthesis and Natural Products.

Career 
Zhu studied chemistry at Hangzhou Normal University and at Lanzhou University, both in China. He then joined Henri-Philippe Husson and Jean-Charles Quirion to pursue a PhD in organic chemistry at the Institute de Chimie des Substances Naturelles at the French National Centre for Scientific Research. In 1991, he graduated with a thesis on Synthèse asymétrique de dérivés de l'histrionicotoxine et de spiropipéridines apparentées (Asymmetric synthesis of histrionicotoxin derivatives and related spiropiperidines).

As a postdoctoral researcher he went to work with Derek Barton at the Texas A&M University and pursue research on phosphonic acid synthesis. In 1992, he joined Institut de Chimie des Substances Naturelles (ICSN) as a chargé de recherche. In 2000, he was promoted to directeur de recherche  2nd class, then 1st class in 2006 in the same institute. 

Since 2010, he has been full professor of chemistry at EPFL's School of Basic Sciences of EPFL.

Research 
Zhu’s research focuses on the development of new synthetic methods including multicomponent reactions, catalytic enantioselective transformations, and transition metal catalyzed domino processes. He is also immersed in the total synthesis of complex natural products and bioactive molecules.

Distinctions 
Zhu is the recipient of among others the 2016 Natural Product Chemistry Award from the Royal Society of Chemistry (RSC) Natural Product Chemistry Award, the 2010 Division of Organic Chemistry (Prix SCF-DCO) award from the Société chimique de France (French Chemical Society), the 2009 Chang Jiang Scholars (Qinghua University) awarded by the Chinese Ministry of Education, the 2009 Silver Medal of CNRS, the 2008 Novartis Chemistry Lectureship, the 2004 Liebig Lectureship of the German Chemical Society, and the 2003 Prix “Emile Jungfleisch” of French Academy of Science.

He is a  fellow of the Royal Society of Chemistry. He is editor at the journal Tetrahedron Letters.

Selected works

Books

Papers

References

External links 
 
 Website of the Laboratory of Synthesis and Natural Products

1965 births
Living people
Hangzhou Normal University alumni
Lanzhou University alumni
Academic staff of the École Polytechnique Fédérale de Lausanne